Mohamed Abdel Wahab, also transliterated Mohamed Abd El-Wahhab,  (March 13, 1902 – May 4, 1991), was a prominent 20th-century Egyptian singer, actor, and composer. He is best known for his Romantic and Egyptian patriotic songs.

He was known for his Egyptian nationalist and revolutionary songs like "Ya Masr tam El-Hanna" (O Egypt, happiness is here), "Hay Ala El-Falah" (The call of duty), "El Watan El Akbar" (The Greatest Homeland), "Masr Nadetna falbena El-nedaa" (Egypt Called us and we Have Answered), "Oulo le Masr" (Tell Egypt), "Hob El-watan Fard Alyi" (Patriotism is my Obligation), "Sout El-Gamaheer" (Voice of the Masses), "Ya Nessmet El-Horria" (O The Breeze of Freedom), "Sawae'd men Beladi" (Compatriot Hands).

He also composed the national anthem of Libya which was adopted from 1951 to 1969 and again since 2011.

Life 

Mohamed Abdel Wahab was born in 1902 in Cairo, Egypt, in a neighborhood called Bab El-Sheriyah, where there is now a statue of him. He began his singing career at an early age and made his first public performances at age seven at local productions. He was 13 when he made his first recording. Mohamed Abdel Wahab was a very close friend to compatriot singer Abdel Halim Hafez.

Film career

In 1933, Abdel Wahab began composing his own style of Egyptian film musical after visiting Paris and familiarizing himself with French musical film. He introduced a lighthearted genre of musical film to Egyptian culture eventually composing eight musical comedies between 1933 and 1949. His films portrayed Western social elite and included music that veered off from the traditional Egyptian tune. He starred in his 1934 film The White Flower which broke records in attendance and still plays frequently in Egyptian theaters. In 1950 Abdel Wahab left film to focus on being a more profound singer.

Contribution to Egyptian and Arabic music 
Abdel Wahab composed more than 1820 songs. Abdel Wahab is considered to be one of the most innovative Egyptian musicians of all time, laying the foundation for a new era of Egyptian music with his use of non-local rhythms and refined oud playing.

Despite the fact that Abdel Wahab composed many songs and musical pieces of classical Arabic music, he was notably criticized for his orientation to Western music. In fact, he introduced Western rhythms to Egyptian songs in a way appropriate to the known then very classical forms of Egyptian songs. For example, in 1941, he introduced a waltz rhythm in his song "El Gandol," and, in 1957, he introduced a rock and roll rhythm in Abdel Halim Hafez's song "Ya Albi Ya Khali".

He composed some of the best hits of Nagat El Saghira, including four poems by Nizar Qabbani.

Abdel Wahab played oud before the prominent Egyptian poet, Ahmed Shawqi, and acted in several movies. He composed ten songs for Umm Kulthum. He was the first Egyptian singer to move from silent-era acting to singing.

Abdel Wahab also composed songs for the Lebanese icon Fairuz whom he famously called "Our Ambassador to the Stars" and stated in 1958 that he was the leader of her fan club in Cairo.

Death
Mohamed Abdel Wahab died in his hometown Cairo, Egypt of a stroke on May 4, 1991.

Legacy 
Abdel Wahab was fundamental in establishing a new era of Egyptian music in his homeland and across the Arab world. He also left a mark on the Western world by exposing Egyptian music to Western classical and popular traditions.

He composed Libya, Libya, Libya, the Libyan national anthems.

Tribute 
On March 13, 2012, Google celebrated his 110th birthday with a Google Doodle.

Filmography
As actor
 The White Rose (1933)
 Doumou' el Hub (Love's Tears) (1936)
 Yahya el Hub (Long Live Love) (1938)
 Yawm Sa'id (Happy Day) (1939)
 Mamnou'a el Hub (Love Is Forbidden) (1942)
 Rossassa Fel Qalb (A Bullet in the Heart) (1944)
 Lastu mallakan (I'm No Angel) (1947)
Ghazal Al Banat (The Flirtation of Girls) (1949)

Honours

Egyptian national honours

Foreign honors

References

External links

 
 Biography

Selected Mohammed 'Abd al-Wahhab compositions from YouTube Web site:
 
 
 
 

1901 births
1991 deaths
Egyptian composers
20th-century Egyptian male singers
Egyptian nationalists
Musicians from Cairo
Singers from Cairo
Egyptian oud players
EMI Classics and Virgin Classics artists
20th-century composers
Egyptian male film actors
National anthem writers
Singers who perform in Egyptian Arabic